Eupithecia spissata is a moth in the family Geometridae. It is endemic to China (Sichuan).

The forewings are brownish grey and the hindwings are pale whitish grey along the costa and in the middle and darker grey along the terminal and anal margins.

References

External links

Moths described in 2006
Endemic fauna of Sichuan
Moths of Asia
spissata